Adolf (also spelt Adolph or Adolphe, Adolfo, and when Latinised Adolphus) is a given name with German origins.

The name is a compound derived from the Old High German Athalwolf (or Hadulf), a composition of athal, or adal, meaning "noble" (or had(u)-, meaning "battle, combat"), and wolf. The name is cognate to the Anglo-Saxon name Æthelwulf (also Eadulf or Eadwulf). The name can also be derived from the ancient Germanic elements "Wald" meaning "power", "brightness" and wolf (Waldwulf).

Due to negative associations with German chancellor Adolf Hitler, the adoption of the name has declined in popularity since the end of World War II.

Similar names include Lithuanian Adolfas and Latvian Ādolfs. The female forms Adolphine and Adolpha are far more rare than the male names. Adolphus can also appear as a surname, as in John Adolphus, the English historian.

Popularity and usage
During the 19th and early 20th centuries, Adolf was a popular name for baby boys in German-speaking countries and to a lesser extent also in French-speaking countries (spelled there as Adolphe). After Adolf Hitler came to power in Nazi Germany, the name Adolf became popular again, especially in 1933–1934 and 1937. Due to negative associations with Hitler, the name has declined in popularity as a given name for males since the 1940s. Adolf Dassler (born 1900), the founder of Adidas, used his nickname, 'Adi', in his professional life and for the name of his company. After 1945, a few German people have been named Adolf due to family traditions.

Similarly, the French version, Adolphe—previously a fairly common name in France and  the name of a classic French novel—has virtually disappeared, along with the Italian version Adolfo. However, the Spanish and Portuguese version, Adolfo, has not become stigmatised in the same way and is still in common use in Spanish- and Portuguese-speaking countries.

Monarchs and nobles
Adolf Frederick, King of Sweden (1710–1771)
Adolf I, Prince of Schaumburg-Lippe (1817–1893)
Adolf II, Prince of Schaumburg-Lippe (1883–1936)
Adolf of Altena (1157–1220), Archbishop of Cologne
Adolf of Nassau (1540–1568), Count of Nassau, brother of William the Silent
Adolf, Count Palatine of the Rhine (1300–1327)
Adolf, Duke of Bavaria  (1434–1441)
Adolf, Duke of Holstein-Gottorp (1526–1586)
Adolf, Duke of Jülich-Berg (1370–1437)
Adolf, King of the Romans (1255–1298), King of Germany
Adolph I, Prince of Anhalt-Köthen (d. 1473)
Adolph II, Prince of Anhalt-Köthen (1458–1526)
Adolphe, Grand Duke of Luxembourg (1817–1905)
Adolphus Cambridge, 1st Marquess of Cambridge (1868–1927)
Adolphus Frederick II, Duke of Mecklenburg-Strelitz (1658–1708)
Adolphus VIII, Count of Holstein (1401–1459), Duke of southern Jutland
Adulf Evil-child (fl. AD 973), more commonly known as Eadwulf Evil-child, Earl of Bamburgh
Ernest Augustus William Adolphus George Frederick, Crown Prince of Hanover (1845–1923)
Gustaf IV Adolf (1778–1837), King of Sweden
Gustaf VI Adolf (1882–1973), King of Sweden
Gustavus Adolphus of Sweden (1594–1632), King of Sweden
Prince Adolf of Schaumburg-Lippe (1859–1917), regent of Lippe
Prince Adolphus, Duke of Cambridge (1774–1850), son of George III of the United Kingdom
Prince Gustaf Adolf, Duke of Västerbotten (1906–1947), Prince of Sweden

Saints
Saint Adulf, early medieval Anglo-Saxon saint
St. Adolphus, 9th-century Spanish martyr
St. Adolf of Osnabrück, 13th-century German martyr
St. Adolphus Ludigo-Mkasa, 19th-century Ugandan martyr

People with the given name in any variant

Adolf

A–G
Adolf Albin (1848–1920), Romanian chess player
Adolf Althoff (1913–1998), German circus owner
Adolf Anderssen (1818–1879), German chess player
Adolf Appellöf (1857–1921), Swedish zoologist
Adolf von Baeyer (1835–1917), German chemist who synthesised indigo and developed a nomenclature for cyclic compounds
Adolf Bastian (1826–1905), German anthropologist
Adolf van den Berg (born 1978), South African cricketer
Adolf A. Berle (1895–1971), American lawyer, educator, author, and diplomat
Ādolfs Bļodnieks (1889–1962), 9th Prime Minister of Latvia
Adolf Bniński (1884–1942), Polish agricultural, conservative, and royalist activist
Adolf Born (1930–2016), Czech artist and filmmaker
Adolf Brand (1874–1945), German journalist
Adolf Brudes (1899–1986), German racing driver
Adolf Busch (1891–1952), German violinist and composer
Adolf Butenandt (1903–1995), German biochemist
Adolf Čech (1841–1903), Czech conductor
Adolf Charlemagne or Sharleman, Russian painter (1826–1901)
Adolf Cluss (1825–1905), German-American architect
Adolf Daens (1839–1907), Belgian theologian
Adolf "Adi" Dassler (1900–1978), German entrepreneur and founder of Adidas
Adolf Deucher (1831–1912), Swiss politician
Adolf Dymsza (1900–1975), Polish comic actor
Adolf Ehrnrooth (1905–2004), Finnish general
Adolf Eichler (1869–1911), German civil architect
Adolf Eichmann (1906–1962), German/Austrian Nazi SS officer
Adolf Etolin (1799–1876), Finnish explorer
Adolf Eugen Fick (1829–1901), German inventor
Adolf Fischer (officer) (1893–1947), German Nazi general
Adolf Froelich (1887–1943), Polish inventor
Adolf Galland (1912–1996), German fighter pilot
Adolf Glassbrenner (1810–1876), German humourist
Adolf Grünbaum (1923–2018), German-American philosopher of science
Adolf Guyer-Zeller (1839–1899), Swiss entrepreneur

H–M
Adolf Abraham Halevi Fraenkel (1891–1965), German-Israeli mathematician
Adolf Hamann (1885–1945), German Nazi general
Adolf von Harnack (1851–1930), German theologian
Adolf Hedin (1834–1905), Swedish newspaper publisher and politician
Adolf Hempt (1874–1943), Serbian biologist, founder of the Pasteur Institute in Novi Sad
Adolf von Henselt (1814–1889), German composer
Adolf Eduard Herstein (1869–1932), Polish-born painter and engraver
Adolf von Hildebrand (1847–1921), German sculptor
Adolf Bernhard Christoph Hilgenfeld (1823–1907), German theologian
Adolf Hitler (1889–1945), German dictator and leader of the Nazi party
Adolf Hurwitz (1859–1919), German mathematician
Adolf Holtzmann (1810–1870), German philologist
Adolf Hütter (born 1970), Austrian footballer
Adolf Just (1859–1936), German naturalist and founder of Luvos
Adolf Kaufmann (1848–1916), Austrian landscape painter
Adolf Kertész (1892–1920), Hungarian footballer
Adolf Kneser (1862–1930), German mathematician
Adolf Köster (1883–1930), German politician 
Adolf Kussmaul (1822–1902), German physician and the first to describe dyslexia
Adolf Lande (1905–), German drug-control official
Adolf Lindenbaum (1904–1941), Polish mathematician
Adolf Loos (1870–1933), Austrian architect
Adolf Lundin (1932–2006), Swedish oil magnate
Adolf Malan (born 1961), South African rugby union footballer
Adolf Lu Hitler Marak (born ), Indian politician
Adolf Merckle (1934–2009), German entrepreneur and billionaire
Adolf Meyer (architect) (1881–1929), German architect
Adolf Meyer (psychiatrist) (1866–1950), Swiss-American psychiatrist

N–Z
Adolf van Nieuwenaar (c. 1545–1589), Dutch statesman and soldier, stadtholder of Overijssel, Guelders and Utrecht
Adolf Erik Nordenskiöld (1832–1901), Finnish-Swedish explorer
Adolf Noreen (1854–1925), Swedish linguist
Adolf Oberländer (1845–1923), German caricaturist
Adolf Ogi (born 1942), Swiss politician
Adolf Opálka (1915–1942), Czech anti-Nazi fighter
Adolf Overweg (1822–1852), German scientist
Adolf Petrovsky (1887–?), Soviet diplomat
Adolf Pilar von Pilchau (1851–1925), Baltic German politician
Adolf Pilch (1914–2000), Polish resistance fighter
Adolf Reinach (1883–1917), German phenomenologist
Adolf Rudnicki (1912–1990), Polish-Jewish author
Adolf Rzepko (1825–1892), Polish composer
Adolf Friedrich von Schack (1815–1894), German poet
Adolf Schallamach (1905–1997), German-born British scientist working on rubber friction
Adolf Schärf (1890–1965), President of Austria
Adolf Scherer (born 1938), Slovak footballer of German descent
Adolf Schlagintweit (1829–1857), German explorer
Adolf Schmal (1872–1919), Austrian fencer
Adolf Schreyer (1828–1899), German painter
Adolf Shayevich (born 1937), Rabbi of the Moscow Choral Synagogue and one of two Chief Rabbis of Russia
Adolf Smekal (1895–1959), Austrian physicist
Adolf Stelzer (1908–1977), Swiss footballer
Adolf Stieler (1775–1836), German cartographer
Adolf Stoecker (1835–1909), German theologian
Adolf Strauss (composer) (1902–1944), Czech pianist, violinist, composer, and kapellmeister
Adolf Strauss (general) (1879–1973), general in the Wehrmacht of Nazi Germany
Adolf Theuer (1920–1947), German SS officer at Auschwitz concentration camp
Adolf Tolkachev (1927–1986), Soviet engineer and CIA spy
Adolf von Sonnenthal (1834–1909), Austrian actor
Adolf Tolkachev (1927–1986), Soviet electronics engineer
Adolf "Dado" Topić (born 1949), Croatian singer
Adolf Tortilowicz von Batocki-Friebe, Lithuanian nobleman, lawyer and politician
Adolf Walbrook (1896–1967), Austrian actor
Adolf Wahrmund (1827–1913), Austrian-German orientalist
Adolf Wilbrandt (1837–1911), German novelist
Adolf Windaus (1876–1959), German chemist
Adolf Wölfli (1864–1930), Swiss artist
Adolf Zeising (1810–1876), German psychologist
Adolf Ziegler (1892–1959), German painter and politician
Adolf Zutter (1889–1947), German SS concentration camp officer
Adolf Zytogorski (–1882), Polish-British chess master and translator

Adolfas 
Adolfas Ramanauskas (1918-1957), American born Lithuanian partisan
Adolfas Valeška (1905–1994), Lithuanian-American artist

Adolfo 
Adolfo Aldana (born 1966), Spanish footballer
Adolfo Baines (born 1972), Spanish footballer
Adolfo Battaglia (born 1930), Italian journalist and politician
Adolfo Bautista (born 1979), Mexican footballer
Adolfo Bruno (1945–2003), a.k.a. "Big Al", Italian-American mobster
Adolfo Camarillo (1864–1958), Ranchero, philanthropist, co-founder of the city of Camarillo, California
Adolfo Carrión Jr. (born 1961), served for seven years as borough president of the Bronx
Adolfo Celi (1922–1986), Italian actor and director
Adolfo Constanzo (1962–1989), American serial killer, drug trafficker, and cult leader
Adolfo Correia da Rocha (1907–1995), Portuguese writer and otolaryngologist
Adolfo Schwelm Cruz (1923–2012), Argentine racing driver
Adolfo Domínguez (born 1950), Spanish fashion designer
Adolfo Domínguez Gerardo (born 1991), Mexican footballer
Adolfo Gaich (born 1999), Argentine footballer
Adolfo Gregorio (born 1982), American footballer
Adolfo Guzman (soccer) (born 1995), American footballer
Adolfo Guzmán (1920–1976), Cuban pianist
Adolfo Hernández (born 1997), Mexican footballer
Adolfo Hirsch (born 1986), Argentine footballer
Adolfo Kaminsky (1925–2023), Argentinian member of the French Resistance, document forger
Adolfo Lima (born 1990), Uruguayan footballer
Adolfo Luxúria Canibal (born 1959), Portuguese musician and lawyer
Adolfo Machado (born 1985), Panamanian footballer
Adolfo Miranda (born 1989), Spanish footballer
Adolfo Muñoz (born 1997), Ecuadorian footballer
Adolfo Ovalle (born 1970), Chilean footballer
Adolfo Ovalle (born 1997), Chilean footballer
Adolfo Pérez Esquivel (born 1931), Argentine activist and Nobel Peace Prize winner
Adolfo Ríos (born 1966), Mexican footballer
Adolfo Sardiña (1933–2021), Cuban-American fashion designer, known by his first name alone
Adolfo Sarti (1928–1992), Italian politician  
Adolfo Suárez (1932–2014), Spanish politician, the first democratically elected Prime Minister of Spain during the Spanish transition to democracy
Adolfo Valencia (born 1968), Colombian footballer
Adolfo Veber Tkalčević (1825–1889), Croatian philologist, writer, and politician
Adolfo Vigorelli (1921–1944), Italian resistance fighter during World War II
Adolfo Zumelzú (1902–1973), Argentine footballer

Adolph 
Adolph Achille Gereau (1893–1994), Virgin Islands civil servant and founder of V.I. Republicans
Adolph Baller (1909–1994), Austrian-American pianist
Adolph Bieberstein (1902–1981), American football player
Adolph Caesar (1933–1986), American actor, voice-over artist, theatre director, dancer, and choreographer
Adolph von Carlowitz, German army General
Adolph Coors (1847–1929), American businessman and founder of Coors Brewery
Adolph "A.J." DeLaGarza (Adolfo Guzmán1987), American footballer
Adolph Deutsch (1897–1980), British-American composer, conductor, and arranger
Adolph Fischer (1858–1887), German labor union activist
Adolph Goldschmidt (1863–1944), German-Jewish art historian
Adolph Green (1914–2002), American lyricist and playwright
Adolph Hallis (1896–1987), South African pianist, composer, and teacher
Adolph Herseth (1921-2013), American orchestral trumpet player
Adolph Sutro (1830–1898), mayor of San Francisco
Adolph Jacobs (1939–2014), American guitar player
Adolph Joffe (1883–1927), Russian-Jewish diplomat
Adolph Johannes Brand (born 1934), South African pianist and composer known as Abdullah Ibrahim
Adolph Kissell (1920–1983), American football player
Adolph Kliebhan (1897–1963), American football player
Adolph Koldofsky (1905–1951), Canadian violinist
Adolph Kolping (1813–1865), German priest
Adolph Kukulowicz (1933–2008), Canadian ice hockey player
Adolph Malan (1910–1963), South African flying ace in World War II
Adolph Marx, birth name of American comic actor Harpo Marx (1888–1961)
Adolph Marix (1848–1919), American military officer and general
Adolph Mongo (born 1954), American political strategist and commentator
Adolph Ochs (1858–1935), American newspaper publisher
Adolph L. Reed Jr. (born 1947), American professor of political science and writer
Adolph Rupp (1901–1977), American college basketball coach
Adolph "Dolph" Schayes (1928–2015), American basketball player
Adolph G. Schwenk (1922–2004), American Marine general
Adolph "Young Dolph" Thornton (1985–2021), American independent rap artist
Adolph Tidemand (1814–1876), Norwegian classical romantic painter
Adolph Treidler (1886–1981), American artist known for his illustrations, posters, commercial art, and wartime propaganda posters
Adolph von Carlowitz (1858–1928), German army commander during the First World War
Adolph P. Yushkevich (1906–1993), Russian mathematician
Adolph Zukor (1873–1976), Hungarian-Jewish American film mogul and founder of Paramount Pictures
Hubert Blaine Wolfeschlegelsteinhausenbergerdorff Sr. (1914–1997), American typesetter whose actual name starts with "Adolph"

Adolphe 
Adolphe Adam (1803–1856), French composer and music critic
Adolphe Alexandre Chaillet (1867–1914), French inventor of the Centennial Light
Adolphe Crémieux (1796–1880), French-Jewish lawyer and statesman
Adolphe Goldschmidt (1838–1918), German-Jewish co-inheritor of the Goldschmidt family bank
Adolphe Guillaumat (1863–1940), French Army general during World War I
Adolphe Hug (1923–2006), Swiss footballer
Adolphe Max (1869–1939), Belgian politician and mayor of Brussels
Adolphe Menjou (1890–1963), American actor and anti-Communist activist
Adolphe Muzito, Congolese politician who was Prime Minister of the Democratic Republic
Adolphe Nourrit (1802–1839), French opera singer
Adolphe Sax (1814–1894), Belgian musician and inventor of the saxophone
Adolphe Teikeu (born 1990), Cameroonian footballer
Adolphe Thiers (1797–1877), French Prime Minister, President, and historian
Adolphe Tohoua (born 1983), Ivorian footballer
Adolphe Willette (1857–1926), French painter and architect of the Moulin Rouge

Adolphus 
Adolphus Anthony "Doc" Cheatham (1905–1997), American jazz trumpeter, singer, and bandleader
Adolphus Busch (1839–1913), American businessman and co-founder of Anheuser-Busch
Adolphus Jean Sweet (1920–1985), American actor
Adolphus L. Fitzgerald (1840–1921), Justice of the Supreme Court of Nevada
Adolphus W. Green (1844–1917), American businessman and founder of Nabisco
Adolphus Grimes (1913–1998), American baseball player
Adolphus Jones (born 1984), Kittian and Nevisian track and field athlete and footballer
Adolphus Warburton Moore (A. W. Moore), British civil servant and mountaineer (1841–1887)
Adolphus Ofodile (born 1979), Nigerian footballer
Adolphus Busch Orthwein (1917–2013), American heir and business executive and formerly missing person
Adolphus Washington (born 1994), American football player

People with the surname Adolf or Adolphus
Helen Adolf (1895–1998), Austrian–American linguist and literature scholar 
John Adolphus (1768–1845), English historian
John Leycester Adolphus (1795–1862), English lawyer, jurist and author

Fictional characters
Adolphus, a character in The Adventures of Baron Munchausen
Adolphus, a character in The Adventures of Huck Finn
Adolphus Cusins, a character in Major Barbara by George Bernard Shaw
Adolphus Tips, the eponymous cat of The Amazing Story of Adolphus Tips by Michael Morpurgo
Dolph Starbeam, a character in the animated sitcom The Simpsons
Dolph, an antagonist on the animated series Alfred Jodocus Kwak
Adolf Kamil and Adolf Kaufmann, title characters of the manga Adolf by Osamu Tezuka
Saint Adolphus, a character in Ken Follett's The Pillars of the Earth
Adolf Verloc, a character in Joseph Conrad's The Secret Agent
Adolf K. Weismann, also known as Yashiro Isana, is the main protagonist in the anime series K
Adolf Wolf, a character in Blitz Wolf
Adolphe Pescarolo, principal of Shuchiin Academy in Kaguya-sama: Love Is War
Adolf, one of the main villains in Armour of God II: Operation Condor
Adolfo Pirelli a minor antagonist in Sweeney Todd: The Demon Barber of Fleet Street (2007 film)

See also
Æthelwulf (disambiguation)
Athaulf
Adolff
Adolphine, the female equivalent of the name Adolf
Dolf (disambiguation)
Dolph (disambiguation)
Ludolph
Rudolph
Adolfas
Ādolfs
Udolphus

References

Adolf Hitler
German masculine given names
Dutch masculine given names
Adolphus
Norwegian masculine given names
Swedish masculine given names
Finnish masculine given names
French masculine given names
Danish masculine given names
Icelandic masculine given names
Swiss masculine given names
Polish masculine given names
Czech masculine given names
Slovak masculine given names
Croatian masculine given names
Slovene masculine given names
Masculine given names
Connotation